Herts/Middlesex 1 is a tier 9 English Rugby Union league.  It is organised by the London and South East Division Rugby Football Union and is the top tier competition for clubs in Hertfordshire and parts of north-west London that traditionally was encompassed by the historic county of Middlesex.  When it was formed ahead of the 1992–93 season it was known as Herts/Middlesex, changing to its current name by the 1996–97 season.  

Each year some of the clubs in this division also take part in the RFU Junior Vase - a level 9-12 national competition.  Promoted teams typically go up to London 3 North West while relegated teams drop to Herts/Middlesex 2.

Participating Clubs 2021-22

The teams competing in 2021-22 achieved their places in the league based on performances in 2019-20, the 'previous season' column in the table below refers to that season not 2020-21.

Season 2020–21

On 30 October the RFU announced  that a decision had been taken to cancel Adult Competitive Leagues (National League 1 and below) for the 2020/21 season meaning Herts/Middlesex 1 was not contested.

Participating Clubs 2019-20

Participating Clubs 2018-19

Participating Clubs 2017-18

Participating Clubs 2016-17
Barnet Elizabethans
Hendon (promoted from Herts/Middlesex 2)
Hillingdon Abbots 
London French
London Welsh Amateur
Old Actonians (relegated from London 3 North West)
Old Streetonians 
Royston
Saracens Amateurs (promoted from Herts/Middlesex 2)
U.C.S. Old Boys 
Old Verulamians
Wasps (relegated from London 3 North West)

Participating Clubs 2015-16
Bank of England
Barnet Elizabethans
Cheshunt
Hillingdon Abbots (promoted from Herts/Middlesex 2)
London French (promoted from Herts/Middlesex 2)
London Welsh Amateurs
Old Millhillnians
Old Streetonians (relegated from London 3 North West)
Royston
U.C.S. Old Boys (relegated from London 3 North West)
Verulamians

Participating Clubs 2014-15
Bank of England
Barnet Elizabethans
Cheshunt
Feltham (promoted from Herts/Middlesex 2)
Haringey Rhinos
Kilburn Cosmos
London Nigerian (relegated from London 3 North West)
London Welsh Amateurs (relegated from London 3 North West)
Old Actonians
Old Millhillians
Royston
Verulamians

Participating Clubs 2013-14
Bank of England
Barnet Elizabethans (relegated from London 3 North West)
Belsize Park
Cheshunt (relegated from London 3 North West)
Hackney
Haringey Rhinos (relegated from London 3 North West)
Imperial Medicals (relegated from London 3 North West)
Kilburn Cosmos
Old Actonians
Old Millhillians
Royston
Verulamians

Participating Clubs 2012-13
Bank Of England
Belsize Park
Hackney
Harlequin Amateurs
Harrow
Hendon
London Welsh Amateurs
Old Actonians
Old Merchant Taylors'	
Old Millhillians	
Verulamians	
West London

Participating Clubs 2009-10
Harlequin Amateurs
Hackney
Hendon
Old Ashmoleians
Verulamians
Old Actonians
Old Priorians
Saracens Amateurs
Wasps

Original teams

When this division was created in 1992 (as Herts/Middlesex) it contained the following teams:

Antlers - promoted from Middlesex 2 (runners up)
Centaurs - promoted from Middlesex 1 (5th)
Haringey Rhinos - promoted from Middlesex 1 (3rd)
Harrow - promoted from Middlesex 1 (4th)
Hitchin - promoted from Hertfordshire 1 (3rd)
Hemel Hempstead - relegated from London 3 North West (10th)
Hendon - promoted from Middlesex 1 (8th)
London New Zealand - promoted from Middlesex 1 (6th)
Old Meadonians - promoted from Middlesex 2 (champions)
Stevenage Town - promoted from Hertfordshire 1 (3rd)
St. Mary's Hospital - relegated from London 3 North West (11th)
Twickenham - promoted from Middlesex 1 (9th)
Uxbridge - promoted from Middlesex 1 (7th)

Herts/Middlesex 1 honours

Herts/Middlesex (1992–93)

Originally known as Herts/Middlesex, this division was a tier 8 league with promotion to London 3 North West and relegation to either Hertfordshire 1 or Middlesex 1.  The introduction of National 5 South ahead of the 1993–94 season meant that Herts/Middlesex dropped to become a tier 9 league.

Herts/Middlesex 1 (1996–2000)

Restructuring of the leagues by the RFU, which included the cancellation of National 5 South and the merging of the Hertfordshire and Middlesex regional divisions, meant that Herts/Middlesex was renamed as Herts/Middlesex 1 and was once again a tier 8 league.  Promotion continued to London 3 North West, while relegation was now to the new Herts/Middlesex 2.

Herts/Middlesex 1 (2000–2009)

The introduction of London 4 North West ahead of the 2000–01 season meant Herts/Middlesex 1 dropped to become a tier 9 league with promotion to this new division.  Relegation continued to Herts/Middlesex 2.

Herts/Middlesex 1 (2009–present)

Herts/Middlesex 1 remained a tier 9 league despite national league restructuring by the RFU.  Promotion was to London 3 North West (formerly London 4 North West) and relegation to Herts/Middlesex 2.

Number of league titles

Chiswick (2)
Hitchin (2)
Wasps Amateurs (2)
Bank Of England (1)
Barnet (1)
Cheshunt (1)
CS Rugby 1863 (1)
Finchley (1)
H.A.C. (1)
Hackney (1)
Hampstead (1)
Haringey Rhinos (1)
Harpenden (1)
Harrow (1)
Hemel Hempstead (1)
Hendon (1)
Imperial Medicals (1)
Kilburn Cosmos (1)
London Welsh (1)
Mill Hill (1)
Old Actonians (1)
Richmond (1)
Tring (1)
Twickenham (1)
Verulamians (1)

Notes

See also
London & SE Division RFU
Hertfordshire RFU
Middlesex RFU
English rugby union system
Rugby union in England

References

Rugby union leagues in England
Rugby union in Hertfordshire
Rugby union in Middlesex